Iceland spar, formerly called Iceland crystal and also called optical calcite, is a transparent variety of calcite, or crystallized calcium carbonate, originally brought from Iceland, and used in demonstrating the polarization of light (see polarimetry). It occurs in large readily cleavable crystals, is easily divisible into parallelepipeds, and is remarkable for its birefringence. This means that the refractive index of the crystal is different for light of different polarization. A ray of unpolarized light passing through the crystal is divided into two rays of perpendicular polarization directed at different angles. This double refraction causes objects seen through the crystal to appear doubled.

Historically, the double-refraction property of this crystal was important to understanding the nature of light as a wave. This was studied at length by Christiaan Huygens and Isaac Newton. Sir George Stokes also studied the phenomenon. Its complete explanation in terms of light polarization was published by Augustin-Jean Fresnel in the 1820s.

Mines producing Iceland spar include many mines producing related calcite and aragonite as well as those famously in Iceland, productively in the greater Sonoran Desert region as in Santa Eulalia, Chihuahua, Mexico and New Mexico, United States, as well as in China. The clearest specimens, as well as the largest, have been from the Helgustadir mine in Iceland.

Viking "sunstone"

It has been speculated that the sunstone (a different mineral from the gem-quality sunstone) mentioned in medieval Icelandic texts such as Rauðúlfs þáttr was Iceland spar, and that Vikings used its light-polarizing property to tell the direction of the sun on cloudy days for navigational purposes. The polarization of sunlight in the Arctic can be detected, and the direction of the sun identified to within a few degrees in both cloudy and twilight conditions using the sunstone and the naked eye. The process involves moving the stone across the visual field to reveal a yellow entoptic pattern on the fovea of the eye, probably Haidinger's brush. The recovery of an Iceland spar sunstone from a ship of the Elizabethan era that sank in 1592 off Alderney suggests that this navigational technology may have persisted after the invention of the magnetic compass.

Nicol prism
William Nicol (1770–1851) invented the  first polarizing prism, using Iceland spar to create his Nicol prism.

Cultural references
The Thomas Pynchon novel Against the Day uses the doubling effect of Iceland spar as a theme.

References

Calcium minerals
Carbonate minerals
Medieval Iceland
Optical materials
Polarization (waves)
Transparent materials
Trigonal minerals
Christiaan Huygens